Aïn El Hadid is a town and commune in Tiaret Province in northwestern Algeria. 

15,482 Population [2008] – Census

441.0 km² Area

35.11/km² Population Density [2008]

1.5% Annual Population Change [1998 → 2008]

References

Communes of Tiaret Province